Personal Column is a 1939 French thriller film directed by Robert Siodmak and starring Maurice Chevalier, Pierre Renoir,  Marie Déa and Erich von Stroheim. It was shot at the Joinville Studios in Paris. The film's sets were designed by the art directors Maurice Colasson and Georges Wakhévitch. Lured, an American re-make, directed by Douglas Sirk and starring Lucille Ball, was released in 1947.

Plot
After one of her fellow taxi dancers is murdered by an unknown man whom she met through a personal column ad, Adrienne Charpentier is recruited by the police to answer a series of similar adverts to try to track down the killer. She meets and falls in love with the charming nightclub owner and womanizer Robert Fleury, but clues begin to appear that suggest that it is he who is the murderer.

Partial cast
 Maurice Chevalier as Robert Fleury
 Marie Déa as Adrienne Charpentier, la journaliste/the newspaper woman
 Pierre Renoir as Brémontier
 Erich von Stroheim as Pears, l'ex-couturier/the former fashion designer
 André Brunot as Ténier, l'inspecteur en chef/the chief inspector
 Jacques Varennes as Maxime
 Henri Bry as Oglou Vacapoulos
 Catherine Farel as Lucie Baral
 Madeleine Geoffroy as Valérie
 Milly Mathis as Rose
 Jean Témerson as Batol, un inspecteur/an inspector
 Mady Berry as Sidonie, la cuisinière/the cook
 Pierre Magnier as l'homme d'affaires/the businessman
 André Numès Fils as le spectateur barbu/the bearded bystander
 Raymond Rognoni as un inspecteur de police/a police inspector
 Pierre Labry as Le danseur

Bibliography
 Alpi, Deborah Lazaroff. Robert Siodmak: A Biography. McFarland, 1998.

See also
Sea of Love
The Personals

External links
 

1930s thriller films
French crime drama films
1939 crime drama films
Films directed by Robert Siodmak
Films scored by Michel Michelet
1939 films
1930s French-language films
Films set in Paris
French black-and-white films
Films shot at Joinville Studios
1930s French films